The West Indies cricket team toured India for 4-match ODI series from 21 January 2007 to 31 January 2007.

Squads

ODI series

1st ODI

2nd ODI

3rd ODI

4th ODI

References

External links
 CricketArchive
 Wisden Cricketers Almanack 2007

2007 in West Indian cricket
2007 in Indian cricket
2006-07
Indian cricket seasons from 2000–01
International cricket competitions in 2006–07